Lake Rotokare is a landslide dammed lake in the New Zealand region of Taranaki.

The  Scenic Reserve, in the Tangahoe catchment, is the country's largest wetland and lake habitat inside a predator proof fence. It is administered by South Taranaki District Council and Rotokare Scenic Reserve Trust. Species in the Reserve include raupo, flax, purei, makura, pukatea, kahikatea, coprosma, swamp maire, water millet, jointed baumea, Australasian bittern, spotless crake, fernbird, gold striped gecko, banded kokopu, koura, and short and long-finned eel.

Lake Rotokare should not be confused with Barrett Lagoon near New Plymouth, which has the alternative Māori language name of Rotokare.

History 
The Reserve was created in the early 1870s. Road access was created in 1914. In 2008, the Rotokare Scenic Reserve Trust completed construction of a predator proof fence around the reserve.

Reintroduction of native bird species 
A number of bird species have been reintroduced into the reserve:

 Western Brown Kiwi (Apteryx mantelli) in 2012
 Tīeke/saddleback and pōpokatea/whitehead in May 2014.
 Hihi (Stitchbird) in 2017 with additional birds added to the population in 2018.
 Pateke (Brown Teal) in May 2019.
 Titipounamu (Rifleman) in 2019

References

External links
Rotokare Scenic Reserve

South Taranaki District
Wildlife sanctuaries of New Zealand
Rotokare
Protected areas of Taranaki